Anopsobius is a genus of centipedes in the family Henicopidae. It was described by Italian entomologist Filippo Silvestri in 1899.

Species
There are 10 valid species:

 Anopsobius actius Chamberlin, 1962
 Anopsobius diversus Chamberlin, 1962
 Anopsobius giribeti (Edgecombe, 2004)
 Anopsobius macfaydeni Eason, 1993
 Anopsobius neozelanicus Silvestri, 1909
 Anopsobius patagonicus Silvestri, 1909
 Anopsobius productus Silvestri, 1899
 Anopsobius relictus (Chamberlin, 1920)
 Anopsobius schwabei (Verhoeff, 1939)
 Anopsobius wrighti Edgecombe, 2003

References

 

 
 
Centipede genera
Animals described in 1899
Taxa named by Filippo Silvestri